Gamal Helal (born March 22, 1954) is an Egyptian-American interpreter and diplomat who translated on behalf of multiple Presidents of the United States and Secretaries of State.

Early life
Helal, a Coptic Christian, was born in Asyut, Egypt, in 1954 and went on to study at Assiut University, where he earned a B.A.  When he was 21 years of age, Helal left Egypt for the United States; studying at Vermont's School for International Training, he received an M.A. in cross-culture communication. In 1983 Helal officially became a U.S. citizen.

Diplomatic career
He began his diplomatic career in the mid-1980s when he joined the United States Department of State. In the lead-up to the Gulf War, Helal interpreted for Secretary of State James A. Baker III and Iraqi emissary Tariq Aziz at a meeting in Geneva, Switzerland, at which time Aziz was presented with an ultimatum to withdraw troops from Kuwait.

By 1993 he was a senior diplomatic interpreter, and later senior policy adviser to Dennis Ross, then the special Middle East coordinator under President Bill Clinton. Ross, reflecting on his engagement in the Israeli-Palestinian peace process, stated that "Most of my meetings with Yasser Arafat would start off with my delegation, but the real work would be done with just Arafat, me and Gamal." At the end of Clinton's term, Helal interpreted between him and Yasser Arafat during peace talks at Camp David, and was once tasked to speak alone with Arafat to try to convince him of the opportunity of the Israeli offer. 

Helal continued to work under President George W. Bush and with Secretary of State Condoleezza Rice, and was an interpreter and senior adviser on the Middle East for the Barack Obama administration until he left in October 2009 to launch his own consulting business, named Helal Enterprises.

References

1954 births
People from Asyut
Living people
Egyptian people of Coptic descent
American people of Coptic descent
Coptic Christians
American Oriental Orthodox Christians
Assiut University alumni
SIT Graduate Institute alumni
Egyptian emigrants to the United States
Interpreters
United States Department of State officials
American diplomats